Andrew Lewis Intrater (born 1962) is an American capital investor.

Career 
Intrater manages the investment firm Sparrow Capital, formerly known as Columbus Nova, which was the American affiliate of the Russian Renova Group, where he also served on the board of directors. Renova Group is owned by Intrater's cousin, the Russian oligarch Victor Vekselberg. Columbus Nova's biggest asset at the time was a controlling stake in CIFC, a publicly-traded company that managed credit investments. Together with Israel's former prime minister Ehud Barak, Intrater was on the board of CIFC. CIFC was sold in 2016 for US$333 million to F.A.B. Partners, an investment vehicle of Qatar's royal family. Vekselberg's assets were frozen due to the economic sanctions against Russia.

He serves on the executive committee of Steven Spielberg's Shoah Foundation. He holds a Bachelor of Science in chemical engineering from Rutgers University.

Political donations

George Santos 
Intrater gained wider public attention in 2023, when it was revealed that he was a major donor to George Santos, a right-wing freshman congressman of the Republican Party. Santos was later caught lying to the public on multiple occasions, in particular involving his résumé. The Washington Post reported that Santos’s main campaign committee received the maximal individual amount of USD 5,800 from Intrater as well as his wife. On top of that committees with connections to Santos received ”tens of thousands” of Dollars. Intrater's personal holding company invested “hundreds of thousands of Dollars“ into a bond fund run by Santos former employer Harbor City, which was accused by regulators of running a Ponzi scheme. Intrater claims to have been a victim of the fraud.

Other political affiliations 
Intrater had close ties with Michael Cohen, Donald Trump’s long time personal lawyer, who received a USD 1,000,000 consulting contract from Intrater’s firm Columbus Nova. Intrater also paid USD 250,000 to attend the inauguration ceremony of Donald Trump. The lawyers of Stormy Daniels believed that he contributed to her hush money payment. Intrater also donated to the campaign of Madison Cawthorn, another right-wing newcomer of the Republican Party.

Private life 
Intrater was born in New York and raised in New Jersey. His family originates from Drohobych in today's Ukraine. His father was a survivor of the Holocaust. He speaks English, Russian and Polish. His brother Frederick was accused of being involved with alt-right politics after purchasing web domains deemed to have alt-right name connotations, with Frederick explaining he only intended to "flip" them for a profit.

References 

1962 births
Private equity and venture capital investors
Sanctions and boycotts during the Russo-Ukrainian War
Donald Trump 2016 presidential campaign
Living people